Harish Singh Dhami is an Indian politician from Uttarakhand and a two term Member of the Uttarakhand Legislative Assembly. He represents the Dharchula (Uttarakhand Assembly constituency). He is a member of the Indian National Congress. In 2014, he vacated his seat for at that time Chief Minister of Uttarakhand Harish Rawat, after that he was appointed the Chairman of Van Vikas Nigam (Rank Cabinet Minister).

Positions held

References

Living people
20th-century Indian politicians
Indian National Congress politicians from Uttarakhand
People from Pithoragarh district
Year of birth missing (living people)
Uttarakhand MLAs 2017–2022
Uttarakhand MLAs 2022–2027